The Nun River is a river in Bayelsa State, Nigeria. The Nun River is formed when the Niger River splits into two at Toru-Abubou, near Agbere Town in Sagbama Local Government Area of Bayelsa State, forming the Nun and the Forcados rivers.

Its course runs mainly through thinly settled areas and swamps.

In the 19th century, the Nun was a hub for trade between the Igbo Kingdom, which was based at Aboh, and Europe. The river's trading history began with the trade of slaves but was later replaced by palm oil export. However, at the turn of the century, the river mouth silted heavily, blocking the passage. Subsequently, traders began using the more accessible waters of the Forcados River.

The Nun River is immortalised in the poetry of Gabriel Okara in His poem "The Call of the River Nun" it is a nostalgic ode to the river that passes through his home.

References

Rivers of Rivers State
Distributaries of the Niger River